Gmina Dobre may refer to either of the following rural administrative districts in Poland:
Gmina Dobre, Masovian Voivodeship
Gmina Dobre, Kuyavian-Pomeranian Voivodeship